Sergejs Fjodorovs (born 1956) is a Latvian politician. He is a member of the Socialist Party of Latvia and was a deputy of the 8th, 9th and 10th Saeima (Latvian Parliament).

References

1956 births
Living people
People from Viļāni Municipality
Latvian people of Russian descent
Socialist Party of Latvia politicians
Deputies of the 8th Saeima
Deputies of the 9th Saeima
Deputies of the 10th Saeima